There have been at least two ships of the Swedish Navy named HSwMS Gotland after the island in the Baltic Sea.

  – a seaplane cruiser launched in 1933 and scrapped in 1963
  – a  attack submarine launched in 1995 and as of 2019 in active service

Swedish Navy ship names